Paraliagonum is a genus of ground beetles in the family Carabidae. This genus has a single species, Paraliagonum longipes. It is found in Somalia.

References

Platyninae